Great Killough, Llantilio Crossenny, Monmouthshire is a substantial manor house of late medieval origins. The majority of the current structures date from three building periods from 1600 to 1670. It is a Grade II* listed building.

History
The site of the house is ancient and Cadw describes the original building as late medieval. Sir Cyril Fox and Lord Raglan, in the third of their three-volume study, Monmouthshire Houses, date the present house to three periods of building, 1600, 1630 and 1670. Peter Smith, in his study, Houses of the Welsh Countryside, notes Great Killough as a fine example of the hall house type. Coflein records the existence of a "panelled attic" which may have served as a chapel. The architectural historian John Newman notes the extensive restoration carried out in 1963-1964. The house remains privately-owned.

Architecture and description
Cadw records Great Killough as a "substantial H-plan mansion". It is built of Old red sandstone rubble with some ashlar dressings and a stone-tiled roof. The four-bay great hall is a "remarkable" "rarity". Great Killough is a Grade II* listed building.

Notes

References 
 
 
 

Buildings and structures in Monmouthshire
Grade II* listed buildings in Monmouthshire
Country houses in Wales